The Bowery Boys Meet the Monsters is a 1954 American comedy film directed by Edward Bernds and starring The Bowery Boys. The film was released on June 6, 1954 by Allied Artists and is the thirty-fourth film in the series.

Plot
The front window of Louie's Sweet Shop is a frequent victim of the local neighborhood kids' baseball games. The Bowery Boys think that a nearby vacant lot would be perfect for the kids to play ball, and keep out of trouble. Slip and Sach travel during a heavy rainstorm to visit the owners of the lot at their home on Long Island. As it turn out, the owners, all members of the same family, are completely insane. Dereck, a mad scientist, wants a brain for his gorilla. His brother Anton wants a brain for his robot, Gorog. Their sister Amelia needs fresh meat to give to her man-eating tree, while their niece Francine is a vampire. Feeling that Slip and Sach are perfect for their personal needs, the family asks the duo to spend the night. The boys soon catch on to the family's schemes, causing a frantic chase through the house. Louie, Butch, and Chuck visit the home to search for Slip and Sach, and it is not long before they too get caught up in all the madness.

Cast

The Bowery Boys
 Leo Gorcey as Terrance Aloysius 'Slip' Mahoney
 Huntz Hall as Horace Debussy 'Sach' Jones
 David Gorcey as Chuck Anderson (Credited as David Condon)
 Bennie Bartlett as Butch Williams

Other  cast
 Bernard Gorcey as Louie Dumbrowski
 Lloyd Corrigan as Anton Gravesend
 Ellen Corby as Amelia Gravesend
 John Dehner as Dr. Derek Gravesend
 Laura Mason as Francine Gravesend
 Paul Wexler as Grissom, the butler
 Norman Bishop as Gorog, the robot (uncredited)
 Paul Bryar as Officer Martin (uncredited)
 Steve Calvert as Cosmos, the gorilla (uncredited)
 Rudy Lee as Herbie Wilkins (uncredited)

Home media
Warner Archives released the film on made-to-order DVD in the United States as part of "The Bowery Boys, Volume Two" on April 9, 2013.

References

External links
 
 
 
 

1950s American films
1950s comedy horror films
1950s English-language films
1950s monster movies
1954 films
1954 comedy films
1954 horror films
Allied Artists films
American black-and-white films
American comedy horror films
American monster movies
American robot films
American vampire films
Bowery Boys films
Films directed by Edward Bernds
Films set in Long Island
Mad scientist films